W.A.K.O. European Championships 1996 were the thirteenth European kickboxing championships hosted by the W.A.K.O. organization arranged by the Serbia and Montenegro kickboxing president Borislav Pelević.  The event was the first ever to be held in Serbia and Montenegro and welcomed the country back into the international community after the devastation of the Bosnian War.  It was open to amateur men and women representing thirty-seven countries in Europe - more detail on the participating nations is provided in the relevant section below. 

There were four styles on offer in Belgrade; Full-Contact, Low-Kick (men only), Semi-Contact and Light-Contact, with no room for Musical Forms.  By the end of the championships, Poland just about shaded Italy into first place by virtue of more silver medals, while Hungary came in third.  The event was held in Belgrade, Serbia and Montenegro in October, 1996.

Participating nations

There were thirty-seven nations from across Europe in attendance at the 1996 W.A.K.O. European Championships in Belgrade:

Full-Contact

Full-Contact was available for both men and women at Belgrade and involved the participants trying to win the contest either by a point decision or via stoppage using both kicks and punches – more detail on the rules can be found at the W.A.K.O. website, although be aware that they may have changed slightly since 1993.  The men had twelve weight classes ranging from 51 kg/112.2 lbs to over 91 kg/+200.2 lbs, while the women had six weight divisions ranging from 48 kg/105.6 lbs to over 65 kg/+143 lbs.  Notable gold medalists included Gary "Smiler" Turner who would go on to win several regional tournaments in K-1, Roman Bugaj who would later turn to pro boxing (and also won silver at the same event in Light-Contact) and Natascha Ragosina who would become a legend in women's boxing.  Another notable medalists was Barrington Patterson who would have some success on the European MMA circuit, as well as becoming a pro-kickboxing world champion.  By the end of the championships, Poland were the strongest nation in Full-Contact, winning five golds and four bronzes across both the male and female competitions.

Men's Full-Contact Kickboxing Medals Table

Women's Full-Contact Kickboxing Medals Table

Low-Kick

Low-Kick differs from Full-Contact kickboxing in that it allows kicks below the knee - more detail on Low-Kick rules can be found at the W.A.K.O. website, although be aware that there may have been some rule changes since 1996.  The style was available to men only and there was twelve weight classes ranging from 51 kg/112.2 lbs to over 91 kg/+200.2 lbs.  Notable winners in this category included Ivan Strugar who would go on to win multiple European and world kickboxing titles and Cengiz Koç who would also have some success as an amateur boxer.  By the championships end the host nation Serbia and Montenegro were the strongest country in Low-Kick, winning two golds, one silver and four bronze medals.

Men's Low-Kick Kickboxing Medals Table

Semi-Contact

Semi-Contact is a form of kickboxing in which fights were won by points given due to technique, skill and speed, with physical force limited - more information on Semi-Contact can be found on the W.A.K.O. website, although the rules will have changed since 1996.  Men and women both took part with the men having eight weight divisions ranging from 57 kg/125.4 lbs to over 89 kg/+195.8 lbs and the women having five ranging from 50 kg/110 lbs to over 65 kg/143 lbs.  By the end of the championships Italy was the most successful nation overall in Semi-Contact, winning four golds, one silver and four bronze medals.

Men's Semi-Contact Kickboxing Medals Table

Women's Semi-Contact Kickboxing Medals Table

Light-Contact

More physical than Semi-Contact but less so than Full-Contact with points awarded and fights won on the basis of speed and technique over power, Light-Contact is seen as a transition stage for fighters who were considering a move from Semi to Full-Contact.  More information on Light-Contact rules can be found of the W.A.K.O. website, although be aware that the rules may have changed since 1996.  Similar to Semi-Contact the men had eight weight divisions ranging from 57 kg/125.4 lbs to over 89 kg/+195.8 lbs while the women had five ranging from 50 kg/110 lbs to over 65 kg/143 lbs.  There were a couple of notable medalists with kickboxing and taekwon-do champion Tomaž Barada winning gold, and future E.B.U. boxing champion Rafał Jackiewicz gaining a bronze.  Poland were the strongest country in Light-Contact at the end of the championships, winning three golds, six silvers and two bronzes across the male and female events.

Men's Light-Contact Kickboxing Medals Table

Women's Light-Contact Kickboxing Medals Table

Overall Medals Standing (Top 5)

See also
List of WAKO Amateur European Championships
List of WAKO Amateur World Championships
List of male kickboxers
List of female kickboxers

References

External links
 WAKO World Association of Kickboxing Organizations Official Site

WAKO Amateur European Championships events
Kickboxing in Serbia
1996 in kickboxing
International sports competitions in Belgrade
1996 in Serbian sport
October 1996 sports events in Europe
1990s in Belgrade